MV Akka was a cargo ship built in 1942 at Stockholm and measured .

On 4 April 1956, Akka left Oxelosund with a cargo of iron ore bound for Glasgow. The ship entered the Clyde on 9 April 1956 and that evening ran onto the rocks. With the ship damaged and taking on water fast, Captain Sundin gave the order to abandon ship. Minutes after running aground Akka turned to port side and collapsed, hitting a number of lifeboats which were attempting to move away from the ship. Three crewmen were killed on site, with a further three dying in hospital.

References

Shipwrecks of Scotland
1942 ships